Daniel Esteban Pedrozo Martínez (born 19 March 2004) is a Colombian footballer currently playing as a defender for Real Cartagena.

Club career
Born in Bucaramanga, Pedrozo began his career with amateur side Independiente Santander, joining at the age of eight. He stayed with Independiente until the age of fourteen, and spent 2019 with Belén La Nubia Arco Zaragoza in Medellín. In January 2020, he signed with professional side Real Cartagena and was immediately integrated into the first team at the age of fifteen.

In early 2023, he was subject of a bid from an unnamed club from the United Arab Emirates.

International career
Pedrozo represented Colombia at the 2023 South American U-20 Championship, where he was one of Colombia's best players during the tournament.

Career statistics

Club

References

2004 births
Living people
People from Bucaramanga
Colombian footballers
Colombia youth international footballers
Association football defenders
Categoría Primera B players
Real Cartagena footballers